In mathematics, especially in the area of mathematical analysis known as dynamical systems theory, a linear flow on the torus is a flow on the n-dimensional torus

which is represented by the following differential equations with respect to the standard angular coordinates 

The solution of these equations can explicitly be expressed as

If we represent the torus as  we see that a starting point is moved by the flow in the direction  at constant speed and when it reaches the border of the unitary -cube it jumps to the opposite face of the cube.

For a linear flow on the torus either all orbits are periodic or all orbits are dense on a subset of the -torus which is a -torus.

Irrational winding of a torus

In topology, an irrational winding of a torus is a continuous injection of a line into a two-dimensional torus that is used to set up several counterexamples. A related notion is the Kronecker foliation of a torus, a foliation formed by the set of all translates of a given irrational winding.

Definition

Now consider a line in  given by the equation  If the slope  of the line is rational, then it can be represented by a fraction and a corresponding lattice point of  It can be shown that then the projection of this line is a simple closed curve on a torus. Moreover, it can be shown that the image of this restricted projection as a subspace, called the irrational winding of a torus, is dense in the torus.

Applications

Irrational windings of a torus may be used to set up counter-examples related to monomorphisms. An irrational winding is an immersed submanifold but not a regular submanifold of the torus, which shows that the image of a manifold under a continuous injection to another manifold is not necessarily a (regular) submanifold. Irrational windings are also examples of the fact that the topology of the submanifold does not have to coincide with the subspace topology of the submanifold. 

Then it is easy to show that the image of the continuous and analytic group homomorphism  is not a regular submanifold for irrational  although it is an immersed submanifold, and therefore a Lie subgroup. It may also be used to show that if a subgroup  of the Lie group  is not closed, the quotient  does not need to be a manifold and might even fail to be a Hausdorff space.

See also

Notes

References

Bibliography

 

General topology
Lie groups
Topological spaces
Dynamical systems
Ergodic theory